Paragi Lal  was an Indian politician. He was elected to the Lok Sabha, the lower house of the Parliament of India from Sitapur, Uttar Pradesh as a member of the Indian National Congress. He was also a member of the Constituent Assembly of India.

References

External links
 Official biographical sketch in Parliament of India website

1898 births
Year of death missing
Indian National Congress politicians
Lok Sabha members from Uttar Pradesh
India MPs 1952–1957
India MPs 1957–1962
Members of the Constituent Assembly of India